The 2014–15 Verbandspokal, (English: 2014–15 Association Cup) consisting of twenty one regional cup competitions, the Verbandspokale, is the qualifying competition for the 2015–16 DFB-Pokal, the German Cup.

All clubs from the 3. Liga and below could enter the regional Verbandspokale, subject to the rules and regulations of each region. Clubs from the Bundesliga and 2. Bundesliga could not enter but were instead directly qualified for the first round of the DFB-Pokal. Reserve teams are not permitted to take part in the DFB-Pokal or the Verbandspokale. The precise rules of each regional Verbandspokal are laid down by the regional football association organising it.

All twenty one winners were qualified for the first round of the German Cup in the following season. Three additional clubs were also qualified for the first round of the German Cup, these being from the three largest state associations, Bavaria, Westphalia and Lower Saxony. The qualified team was the runners-up of the Lower Saxony Cup while, in Bavaria and Westphalia, the best-placed Regionalliga Bayern and Oberliga Westfalen non-reserve team qualified for DFB-Pokal.

Of the twenty two teams qualified for the DFB-Pokal through the Verbandspokale, eighteen were knocked out in the first round. Three clubs, SSV Reutlingen, FC Carl Zeiss Jena and FC Viktoria Köln, were knocked out in the second round while SpVgg Unterhaching was the only one of the twenty two to advance to the third, where it lost to Bayer Leverkusen. Jena and Unterhaching eliminated one Bundesliga club each in the first round, Hamburger SV and FC Ingolstadt 04 while the others advanced though defeating 2. Bundesliga clubs.

Finals
The 2014–15 Verbandspokal finals with the winners qualified for the 2015–16 DFB-Pokal:

 Winners in bold.
 ¶The three largest regional associations were allowed to send an additional team. In Lower Saxony this was the losing finalist of the cup. In Bavaria and Westphalia this place went to the best non-reserve team of the Regionalliga Bayern, Würzburger Kickers, and the Oberliga Westfalen, TuS Erndtebrück.
 ‡ As Holstein Kiel was already qualified for the DFB-Pokal through its 3. Liga place VfB Lübeck was qualified regardless of the outcome of the final.

Clubs by league
The clubs qualified for the 2015–16 DFB-Pokal by league:

 Clubs who qualified as runners-up in italics

References

External links
 Official DFB website  The German Football Association
 Fussball.de  Official results website of the DFB

2014–15 in German football cups
Verbandspokal seasons